Belsand is a town in the state of Bihar, India.

Geography

Demographics
 India census, Belsand had a population of 20,566. Males constitute 53% of the population and females 47%.  19% of the population is under 6 years of age.

References

cities and towns in Sitamarhi district